The 1970 U.S. Open was the 70th U.S. Open, held June 18–21 at Hazeltine National Golf Club in Chaska, Minnesota, a suburb southwest of Minneapolis. Tony Jacklin shot under-par in all four rounds on his way to a seven-stroke victory and his only U.S. Open title, the second of his two major championships. He was the first champion born in England since Cyril Walker in 1924.

Jacklin led wire-to-wire and was hardly threatened throughout the championship. 

The first round was played in extremely challenging conditions with winds blustering up to 41 miles an hour and resulted in generally high scoring with only 7 players in the field breaking 75. Arnold Palmer shot 79, Gary Player 80, and Jack Nicklaus 81. In contrast Jacklin thrived in the conditions and returned a 71 saying the wind blew harder in England and "the more it blows, the better I like it."

Jacklin took a four-shot lead over Dave Hill into the final round, and despite bogeys at the 7th and 8th, made a long birdie putt at 9 to quell any talk of a collapse. Jacklin shot a third consecutive round of 70 and a 281 total, seven clear of the field and the only player under par.

The final round was broadcast by  ABC. The existing footage includes commentary from Byron Nelson, Dave Marr and Henry Longhurst. 

Opened eight years earlier, Hazeltine was hosting its first men's major championship, and reviews were mixed. Runner-up Hill, when asked what the course lacked, said: "Eighty acres of corn and a few cows. They ruined a good farm when they built this course." Jacklin was more philosophical about the course. "We have to accept things as they are" he said. "After all, they aren't going to change the course just for me. No golf course will suit everybody perfectly."

The course underwent significant renovations; when the U.S. Open returned twenty-one years later in 1991 it drew generally positive reviews, even from Hill. Hazeltine later hosted the PGA Championship twice (2002, 2009) and the Ryder Cup in 2016.

Jacklin's win was the first in the U.S. Open by a European in over forty years and the last for forty more, until Graeme McDowell won at Pebble Beach in 2010. The next win by an Englishman was three years later in 2013, Justin Rose at Merion.

Future major winners Ben Crenshaw (age 18) and John Mahaffey (age 22) tied for low amateur honors at 301 (+13), tied for 36th place. Just out of high school, Crenshaw was tied for eighth after each of the first two rounds.

Course layout

Past champions in the field

Made the cut

Missed the cut

Source:

Round summaries

First round
Thursday, June 18, 1970

Source:
(a) denotes amateur

Second round
Friday, June 19, 1970

Source:
(a) denotes amateur

Third round
Saturday, June 20, 1970

Source:

Final round
Sunday, June 21, 1970

Source:

References

External links
USOpen.com - 1970
Hazeltine National Golf Club

U.S. Open (golf)
Golf in Minnesota
U.S. Open
U.S. Open (golf)
U.S. Open (golf)